Sidhant Gupta (born 23 April, 1989) is an Indian actor and model who predominantly works in Hindi television and films. He made his television debut with Zee TV's romantic-drama Tashan-e-Ishq as Kunj Sarna (2015-16) which earned him Best Beta at Zee Rishtey Awards and nomination for best Debut-Male at Zee Gold Awards.

Gupta made his film debut in 2013 with Tutiya Dil and later on seen in Badmashiyaan. Since then he starred in action-drama Bhoomi (2017) and romantic-thriller Operation Romeo (2022).

Early life and education
Gupta's hometown is in Jammu. He represented J&K in national level under-14 cricket, under-17 swimming and under-19 basketball. Later, he went to Delhi for ground studies for CPL.

Career
Gupta has done a few commercials for Hero Honda, Clear Shampoo, Maruti Suzuki Nano and Close Up. The major chunk of his modelling work includes some of the biggest names and projects: Wills India Fashion Week 2009 ( Varun Bahl), Delhi Fashion Week 2009 (Grand Finale - Rohit Bal), NDTV'S unveiling of the seven wonders of India 2009 (Sabyasachi Mukherjee), Raghavendra Rathore, a cover shoot for India Today, Levi's, Lawrence and Mayo, Times Of India, National campaign for a central shopping mall, Tata AIG Life Insurance, Anoos's Beauty Spa, Federal Bank, The Deccan Chronicle, Confetti - Lifestyle Magazine (Cover Page), the Bangalore Marathon, Internetworks Technology, Studio One and many more.

His debut movie was Badmashiyaan, where Gupta's character Dev was described as "a hopeless romantic who always wears his heart on his sleeve" and "the cute guy every girl would love to take home."

In 2015, Gupta later decided to continue his acting career with television show Tashan-E-Ishq

In 2016, Gupta was a contestant in Jhalak Dikhhla Jaa 9.

In 2017, Director Omung Kumar had signed Gupta for Bhoomi as the lead opposite actress Aditi Rao Hydari and actor Sanjay Dutt.

In 2018, He appeared in a music video Aye Zindagi. The song was sung by Sonu Nigam.

In 2022, He Appeared in a Romantic Film "Operation Romeo". This was aired in April-22.

Media
Sidhant has been featured in the 50 Sexiest Asian Men list of the UK based newspaper Eastern Eye four times viz. 2016, 2017, 2018, 2019.

Filmography

Films

Television

Music videos

Awards & nominations

References

External links

 
 

Male actors in Hindi cinema
Living people
21st-century Indian male actors
Indian male film actors
Indian male models
1989 births
Male actors from Jammu and Kashmir
People from Jammu